Collegium Aureum was a chamber orchestra founded in Cologne, Germany, in 1962, which later focused on historically informed performance. Playing typically without conductor, they recorded for three decades, and performed concerts on international tours.

History 
Collegium Aureum was initiated by the label Deutsche Harmonia Mundi as a group of instrumental soloists dedicated to the recording of early music to up to the 18th century in what was then called "gerechtes Klangbild“ (fair sound image), later called Historische Aufführungspraxis (historically informed performance). They pursued to play Early music, music of the classical period and early Romantic music on historic instruments and with the playing techniques of the earlier times, in appropriate venues. As the Renaissance architecture Zedernsaal hall there had the proportions of the golden ratio they called their group Collegium Aureum (Golden colleagues). The violinist  was concert master, other members included the harpsichordists Bob van Asperen and Gustav Leonhardt, flutists Hans-Martin Linde and Barthold Kuijken, oboist Helmut Hucke, violinist Reinhard Goebel, violist Franz Beyer and timpanist . The ensemble played without conductor, directed by the concert master.

They made recordings from 1962, followed by concerts and productions for radio and television. The group toured in England, France, Japan, Latin America, Northern Africa, the Netherlands, the UdSSR and the Near East. They recorded for three decades, and disbanded in the 1990s. Several recordings were reissued on CD. A 2016 reviewer called their playing "smooth, elegant and thoughtful". Their 1971 recording of Bach's Christmas Oratorio with the Tölzer Knabenchor, conducted by Gerhard Schmidt-Gaden, was described as a vigorous exploration of the Nativity, with a "gratifying eloquence throughout".

Further reading 
 Alain Pâris: Klassische Musik im 20. Jahrhundert. Instrumentalisten, Sänger, Dirigenten, Orchester, Chöre. 2nd edition, dtv, Munich 1997, 
 Robert Strobl: Geschichte der historischen Aufführungspraxis in Grundzügen. Teil II: Von 1970–1990. Pro Musica Antiqua, Regensburg 1992, .

References

External links 
 
 Collegium-Aureum (Instrumental Ensemble) Bach Cantatas Website 2001
 

1962 establishments in West Germany
1990s disestablishments in Germany
Early music orchestras
Disbanded orchestras
Chamber orchestras
Harmonia Mundi artists
Musical groups established in 1962
Musical groups disestablished in the 1990s